The North Shore Line is a proposed commuter rail or light rail line that would serve the North Shore of Auckland, New Zealand.

Background
The North Shore is currently linked to Auckland city centre by way of the Auckland Harbour Bridge, over which Northern Busway services operate. In 2019, about 170,000 vehicles were crossing the bridge each day, including 11,000 trucks and more than 1,000 buses. The following statistics were for the 7–9am morning peak period:
38% of all bridge users were bus passengers
58% of bridge users bound for Auckland CBD (not to the south or west) were bus passengers
20,000 people travelled in cars to the CBD (unchanged for 25 years)
53% of car users were travelling past the CBD to southern or western destinations
11,000 truck crossings rising rapidly and expected to reach 26,000 in 2046

The Northern Busway's usage is tracking towards capacity being reached by 2030. Auckland Transport have studied the future mass transit needs for the North Shore, with light rail being determined the most flexible mode compared to other rail-based options. This may use a tunnel to access Auckland city centre as part of the proposed second Auckland Harbour crossing.

See also
Light rail in Auckland
Public transport in Auckland

References

External links
North Shore Rail

Proposed railway lines in New Zealand
Public transport in Auckland
Rail transport in Auckland